Hanafi Ghazali (born 4 April 1993 in Singapore) is a Singaporean retired footballer.

Career

In 2007, Ghazali moved with his family to Australia, where he played youth football.

In 2010, aged 17, Ghazali signed for Perth Glory in the Australian top flight, where he debuted alongside England international Robbie Fowler in an 8-0 friendly win over Rockingham City. After failing to make an appearance for Perth Glory, he played professionally in the Singaporean S.League before returning to Australia.

References

External links
 Hanafi Ghazali at Soccerway

Singaporean footballers
Living people
1993 births
Association football midfielders
Association football defenders
Association football forwards